The 1952 Cleveland by-election was held on 23 October 1952.  It was held due to the death of the incumbent Labour MP, George Willey.  It was retained by the Labour candidate, Arthur Palmer.

References

1952 elections in the United Kingdom
1952 in England
By-elections to the Parliament of the United Kingdom in North Yorkshire constituencies
Cleveland, England
October 1952 events in the United Kingdom
1950s in Yorkshire